Kalek-e Bayeh (also Romanized as Kalek-e Bāyeh; also known as Kalek, Kalek-e ‘Olyā, and Kalek-e Soflá) is a village in Osmanvand Rural District, Firuzabad District, Kermanshah County, Kermanshah Province, Iran. At the 2006 census, its population was 61, in 11 families.

References 

Populated places in Kermanshah County